Not So Stupid may refer to:

 Not So Stupid (1928 film), a 1928 French silent comedy film
 Not So Stupid (1946 film), a 1946 French comedy film